Popolo may refer to :

Defensio pro Populo Anglicano, a Latin polemic by John Milton.
Missa Pro Populo, a term used in liturgical texts and rules of the Catholic Church.
Nossa Senhora do Pópulo, one of the sixteen civil parishes  that make up the municipality of Caldas da Rainha, Portugal.
Populo Church, a Neoclassical church located in Braga, Portugal.
Populo shipwreck, listed on the National Register of Historic Places in Miami-Dade County, Florida.